West Coast Airlines was an airline (then called a "local service" airline as defined by the federal Civil Aeronautics Board) linking small cities in the Pacific Northwest with larger cities in Washington, Oregon, Idaho, Utah, Montana, California and north to Alberta in Canada. It was headquartered in the Westlake area of Seattle, Washington.

History
West Coast was formed in 1941 and acquired Empire Air Lines (formerly Zimmerly Airlines) in 1952. The company was based at Boeing Field in Seattle and began scheduled passenger service in 1946 with a fleet of Douglas DC-3s, marketed as Scenicliners.

A promotional film produced for the company in the 1960s said that in 1946 the federal Civil Aeronautics Board (CAB) granted the first regional airline certificate to West Coast Airlines as local service air carrier.

In July 1953, West Coast scheduled flights to 32 airports in Washington, Oregon, and Idaho; in May 1968 it flew to 36 airports including 29 in those states. Like other Local Service airlines West Coast was subsidized; in 1962 its "revenues" included $6.6 million from passengers and $5.4 million for "mail".

West Coast was the first local service airline in the U.S. to use turbine airliners when it began Fairchild F-27 flights in September 1958. The F-27 was the U.S. manufactured version of the Dutch built Fokker F27 Friendship. In June 1968 West Coast was the first airline to order Fairchild 228 twin jets with the acquisition of three planned, but the F-228, a smaller variant of the Dutch manufactured Fokker F28 Fellowship, never made it to production.  The only jet operated by West Coast was the Douglas DC-9-14 with 75 seats, all coach.
 
On July 1, 1968, West Coast merged with Pacific Air Lines and Bonanza Air Lines 
to form Air West, which became Hughes Airwest in 1970. In 1968, West Coast operated Douglas DC-9s, Fairchild F-27s, Douglas DC-3s, and Piper Navajos. The DC-3s were not transferred to Air West and were retired; the Navajos continued for a short time.  The West Coast route system then included cities in Idaho, Oregon, Washington, and several in Montana.  San Francisco, Oakland, and Sacramento in northern California were added in 1959 with Salt Lake City being served later. West Coast's only international destination was Calgary, Alberta, which was served with F-27s from Spokane. Almost all West Coast flights at Seattle used Boeing Field (BFI) instead of Seattle/Tacoma International Airport (SEA); after the merger Air West and successor Hughes Airwest continued to use Boeing Field until DC-9 and F-27 flights moved to SEA in 1971.

Jet service destinations in 1968
The April 28, 1968 West Coast timetable listed the following cities being served with Douglas DC-9-10 jets:

 Boise, ID (BOI)
 Eugene, OR (EUG)
 Medford, OR (MFR)
 Pasco, WA (PSC)
 Portland, OR (PDX) 
 Salt Lake City, UT (SLC)
 San Francisco, CA (SFO)
 Seattle, WA - Boeing Field (BFI)
 Spokane, WA (GEG)
 Walla Walla, WA (ALW)
 Yakima, WA (YKM)

Other destinations saw Fairchild F-27s, Douglas DC-3s and/or Piper Navajos (or, in 1966, Piper Aztecs).

West Coast's lineage runs through a string of mergers: In 1980 Hughes Airwest was acquired by Republic Airlines which had been created by a merger of Southern Airways and North Central Airlines in 1979. In 1986 Republic Airlines was acquired by Northwest Airlines (formerly Northwest Orient Airlines). The Delta-Northwest merger with Delta Air Lines as the surviving air carrier was completed in 2010.

In 2001 an attempt was made to resurrect the West Coast Airlines name, with plans for an airline based in Concord, California, to connect several Northern California cities with Las Vegas, Reno and San Diego. The effort ended in bankruptcy.

A Canadian commuter airline with a similar name, West Coast Air, flew floatplanes between Vancouver and Victoria, British Columbia.

Accidents 
This accident marked the first loss of a Douglas DC-9, and the first fatalities for the airline.
 West Coast Airlines Flight 720 crashed on March 10, 1967, with four fatalities and no survivors near Klamath Falls, Oregon. The Fairchild F-27 was bound for Medford from Klamath Falls, and crashed due to ice accumulation on the aircraft.

Fleet 

The West Coast Airlines fleet consisted of the following aircraft:

 13 - Douglas DC-3
 4 - Douglas DC-9-14 
 14 - Fairchild F-27
 Piper Aztec
 Piper Navajo (PA-31 model)

Destinations in 1968 
The April 28, 1968 West Coast timetable lists scheduled passenger flights to:

 Astoria, Oregon 
 Baker, Oregon 
 Boise, Idaho - Focus city
 Burley, Idaho - Rupert, Idaho was served via Burley.
 Calgary, Alberta, Canada - only international destination
 Corvallis, Oregon - Albany, Oregon was served via Corvallis
 Ephrata, Washington - Moses Lake, Washington was served via Ephrata
 Eugene, Oregon
 Great Falls, Montana
 Hoquiam, Washington - Aberdeen, Washington was served via Hoquiam
 Idaho Falls, Idaho
 Kalispell, Montana
 Klamath Falls, Oregon
 Lewiston, Idaho - Clarkston, Washington was served via Lewiston
 Medford, Oregon
 North Bend, Oregon - Coos Bay, Oregon was served via North Bend
 Oakland, California
 Olympia, Washington
 Ontario, Oregon- Payette, Idaho was served via Ontario
 Pasco, Washington
 Pocatello, Idaho
 Portland, Oregon- Focus city
 Pullman, Washington - Moscow, Idaho was served via Pullman
 Redmond, Oregon - Bend, Oregon was served via Redmond
 Roseburg, Oregon
 Sacramento, California
 Salt Lake City, Utah
 San Francisco, California
 Seattle, Washington - Hub and headquarters at Boeing Field (BFI)
 Spokane, Washington - Focus city
 Sun Valley, Idaho 
 Tacoma, Washington
 Twin Falls, Idaho
 Walla Walla, Washington
 Wenatchee, Washington
 Yakima, Washington

See also 
 List of defunct airlines of the United States

References 

 
Defunct companies based in Seattle
Airlines established in 1941
Airlines disestablished in 1968
Defunct regional airlines of the United States
Airlines based in Washington (state)
Defunct airlines of the United States